The 1992 Nabisco Dinah Shore was a women's professional golf tournament, held March 26–29 at Mission Hills Country Club in Rancho Mirage, California. This was the 21st edition of the Nabisco Dinah Shore, and the tenth as a major championship.

Dottie Pepper (Mochrie) won the first of her two major titles in a sudden-death playoff over Juli Inkster with a par on the first extra  Pepper won the event  again in 1999.

Past champions in the field

Final leaderboard
Sunday, March 29, 1992

Playoff

References

External links
Golf Observer leaderboard

Chevron Championship
Golf in California
Nabisco Dinah Shore
Nabisco Dinah Shore
Nabisco Dinah Shore
Nabisco Dinah Shore
Women's sports in California